Sheril Angachi Andiba (born 1 January 2000), known as Sheril Angachi, is a Kenyan footballer who plays as a midfielder for Gaspo Youth FC and the Kenya women's national team.

International career
Angachi capped for Kenya at senior level during the 2018 Africa Women Cup of Nations qualification.

See also
List of Kenya women's international footballers

References

2000 births
Living people
Kenyan women's footballers
Women's association football midfielders
Kenya women's international footballers